Elizabeth Ammons is an American literary scholar, currently the Harriet B. Fay Professor of Literature at Tufts University.

Early life and education
Ammons attended University of Illinois at Urbana–Champaign.

Publications
Select books:
 Critical essays on Harriet Beecher Stowe, 1979
 Edith Wharton's argument with America, 1980
 Conflicting stories : American women writers at the turn into the twentieth century, 1990
 Ethan Frome, 2005
 Brave new words : how literature will save the planet, 2010

References

Year of birth missing (living people)
Living people
Tufts University faculty
American literary historians
University of Illinois Urbana-Champaign alumni
University of Cincinnati alumni